Felix Mikhailovich Blumenfeld (– 21 January 1931) was a Russian and Soviet composer, conductor of the Imperial Opera St-Petersburg, pianist, and teacher.

He was born in Kirovograd (in present-day Ukraine), Kherson Governorate, Russian Empire, the son of Mikhail Frantsevich Blumenfeld, of Austrian Jewish origin, and the  Maria Szymanowska. Blumenfeld studied with Gustav Neuhaus, married to his older sister. Then he studied composition at the St. Petersburg Conservatory under Nikolai Rimsky-Korsakov and piano under Fedor Stein between 1881 and 1885. He then taught piano there himself from 1885 until 1918, whilst also serving as conductor of the Mariinsky Theatre until 1911.

The Mariinsky saw the premieres of the operas composed by his mentor Rimsky-Korsakov. He was also the conductor at the Russian premiere of Wagner's opera Tristan und Isolde.

In 1908, he conducted the Paris premiere of Modest Mussorgsky's opera Boris Godunov.

From 1918 to 1922, he was the director of the Music-drama school of Mykola Lysenko in Kiev, where, amongst others, Vladimir Horowitz was a pupil in his masterclasses. He returned to the Moscow Conservatory in 1922, teaching there until his death. Other famous pupils of his include Simon Barere, Maria Yudina, Nathan Perelman, Anatole Kitain and Maria Grinberg.  He died in Moscow.

As a pianist, he played many of the compositions of his Russian contemporaries. His own compositions, which showed the influence of Frédéric Chopin and Pyotr Ilyich Tchaikovsky, include a symphony, numerous pieces for solo piano, an Allegro de Concert for piano and orchestra, and lieder. His virtuoso pieces for piano in particular have enjoyed something of a renaissance in recent years.

He was the uncle of Heinrich Neuhaus and first cousin, once removed of Karol Szymanowski (Felix's father and Karol's father, Stanislaw Szymanowski, were cousins).

Compositions

References

External links

Austrian-Jew
Russian people of Polish descent
1863 births
1931 deaths
Male classical pianists
Musicians from Kropyvnytskyi
Russian male classical composers
Russian Romantic composers
Composers for piano
Piano pedagogues
19th-century classical composers
19th-century classical pianists
20th-century classical composers
20th-century classical pianists
Male classical composers
19th-century conductors (music)
20th-century Russian conductors (music)
Russian male conductors (music)
20th-century Russian male musicians
Jewish Ukrainian musicians
Soviet male classical composers
Soviet opera composers
Ukrainian classical pianists